Winners Park is a football (soccer) club based in Mookgopong, which is a town roughly 100 km southwest of Polokwane on the N1 and R101 roads, situated inside the Limpopo province of South Africa. They were relegated from the National First Division to Vodacom League in May 2010. This imposed a set of changes for the club, including a move of their home venue from Seshego Stadium, to the less expensive Mookgopong Grounds.

External links
Winners Park Official Website
Summarized NFD Club Info
Official website for National First Division
SAFA Official Website -database with results of Vodacom League

Association football clubs established in 1984
SAFA Second Division clubs
Soccer clubs in Limpopo
1984 establishments in South Africa